is an amusement park in Asakusa, Taitō, Tokyo that has operated since 1853. It is operated by Hanayashiki Co., Ltd., a subsidiary of Bandai Namco Holdings. It is claimed to be the oldest amusement park in Japan. One of the unofficial mascots of the park is the Panda Car.

History

Origins
Asakusa Hanayashiki which opened in 1853, at the end of the Edo period (1603-1867), is considered by many people as the oldest amusement park in Japan.  In fact, the definition of an amusement park was unclear at that time. During the first two decades since the park opened, it was a botanical garden created by garden designer Morita Rokusaburo, where the main attractions were tree peonies and chrysanthemum work. The place was called Hanayashiki, which means Flowery Mansion.

Around 1872 (the beginning of the Meiji period), an amusement facility was established inside the park. From the Taisho era to the early Showa era, it was also known as also one of the leading zoos in Japan, and produced news such as the birth of a tiger quintuplet and the birth of Japan's first baby lion. The Great Kanto earthquake occurred in the same year. Many of the animals were killed in the subsequent fires while locked in their cages. One famous story from that event is the head of the park pouring water on the old elephant in an unsuccessful attempt to save its life.

In 1930, “The Memorial of Birds and Animals” was erected for the animals that were burned to death because of the earthquake. The animals that survived were later sold to the Sendai City Zoo by 1935. The park was effectively closed.

In 1939-40, the park was purchased by the Suda-cho Restaurant, and the name was changed to Shokudo Yuenchi Asakusa Rakutenchi. However, the park was resold to the Sho-chiku, and the name became .

Hanayashiki was demolished in 1944 in accordance with Japan's Air Defense Law (1937; revised 1941) during World War II. Building removal, or structure evacuation, was a process of creating firebreaks to prevent fires from spreading during Allied air raids.

Post war
In 1947, the park rebuilt as  operated under joint management by Tetsuo Amano from Sho-chiku and Teiichi Yamada from Togo Gorakuki. In 1949, Togo Gorakuki became to sole operators in 1949, and the name was changed to Asakusa Hanayashiki. Yashiki was changed from Chinese characters to Japanese characters.
 
In 1953, the roller coaster began operation, and it was named "Yomiuri Rocket Coaster". This is the oldest roller coaster that exists in Japan today. In addition, the "Bee Tower" was built in 1960. These attractions became very famous.

Before 1985 no admission fee was charged. Once inside the park, visitors would pay for each ride. However, the park would be disturbed regularly because anyone could enter the park freely. An example given would be a drunken person entering and ending up getting rowdy or sleeping, causing a public nuisance. Young people would also gather in large groups in front of a game arcade, causing the park to feel unsafe. Because of these situations, operators were unable to increase their profits and thus decided to set an admission fee from 1985 in order to make the park safe and more welcoming.

21st century

In 2004, the operator SuitesーOligo (formerly Toyo amusement machine) bankruptcy, into the "Club Rehabilitation (Japanese : Clubs Reorganization Law)" process, and as Asakusa local businesses Bandai provide operational support group, so that it's the Cape Department of Corporation subsidiary Hanayashiki (Japanese: Corporation took ya shi ki ) (formerly known as Corporation Puaza those have Bldg su) which receives light flower Yashiki right to operate from August 31.

In September 2016, "Bee Tower" was and demolished to make room for Asakusa Hana Gekijyou, which opened in April 2019. There is a theater that provides a variety of entertainment, including productions, concerts by popular musicians, and martial arts.

In popular culture

 1986 - 
 2020 -

See also
History of amusement parks in Japan

References

External links
 

Amusement parks in Japan
Buildings and structures in Taitō
1853 establishments in Japan
19th century in Tokyo
Bandai Namco Holdings subsidiaries
Tourist attractions in Tokyo